Thatta Musa is a village of Bhawana Tehsil located on the bank of Chenab River.

Chiniot District
Populated places in Chiniot District